Helcogramma microstigma is a species of triplefin blenny in the genus Helcogramma. It was described by Wouter Holleman in 2006. This species occurs in the western Indian Ocean off Mozambique, Comoro Islands and Madagascar.

References

microstigma
Taxa named by Wouter Holleman
Fish described in 2006